Obscurior davisi is a moth of the family Erebidae first described by Michael Fibiger in 2010. It is known from Sri Lanka.

The wingspan is 7–9 mm. The head, patagia, anterior part of the tegulae, prothorax, basal part of the costa and costal part of the medial area are black. The costal-medial area is trapezoid. The forewing ground colour is grey, suffused with brown and black scales. The antemedial and subterminal line are present and relatively well marked, brown suffused with brown scales. The subterminal line is outwards beige outlined. The terminal line is marked by black interneural dots.

References

Micronoctuini
Taxa named by Michael Fibiger
Moths described in 2010